Mazi Melesa Pilip (born ) is a Republican legislator in New York's Nassau County Legislature representing Nassau County, Long Island's 10th district. She is an Ethiopian Jew who was born in a poor village in Ethiopia, immigrated to Israel when she was 12 years old, and later served in the Israel Defense Force's Paratroopers Brigade. She studied at the University of Haifa, where she earned a bachelor's degree in occupational therapy, and also studied at Tel Aviv University, where she earned a masters degree in diplomacy and security. In November 2021, Pilip was elected to the Nassau County Legislature.  In January 2023, Politico reporter Olivia Beavers wrote that Pilip was one of two Republicans whom the Nassau County Republican Party was considering running if US Congressman from New York George Santos were to resign.

Biography

Ethiopia, Israel, and the United States
Pilip was born in a small poor village in Ethiopia, grew up without running water in her home, and is an Ethiopian Jew. She immigrated to Israel in 1991 as a refugee when she was 12 years old, along with her family, as part of Operation Solomon. The operation was an Israeli military operation that covertly airlifted over 14,000 Ethiopian Jews to Israel in a day and a half. She has three sisters, all of whom live in Israel.

Upon turning 18 years of age, she served as a paratrooper in the Israel Defense Force's Paratroopers Brigade (Tzanchanim). After her service in the army, Pilip studied at the University of Haifa, where she was Chairwoman of the Ethiopian Student Union for two years, and earned a bachelor's degree in occupational therapy; she also studied at Tel Aviv University, earning a masters degree in diplomacy and security. While at the University of Haifa she met her future husband, Adalbert Pilip, an American-Ukrainian-Jewish medical student who had come from the United States to Haifa to study medicine at the Technion. 

After she and her husband married they moved to the United States, ultimately settling in Great Neck, New York, and her husband is now a cardiologist. She is an Orthodox Jew, has been vice president of her synagogue (Kol Yisrael Achim), and has been active in trying to revitalize Great Neck and in speaking about Israel for Jewish groups. She and her husband have seven children.

Political career
In November 2021, at 42 years of age, Pilip was elected to New York's Nassau County Legislature as a Republican legislator for Nassau County, Long Island's 10th district, defeating four-term incumbent Ellen Birnbaum by seven percentage points. The district covers Manhasset, Manhasset Hills, North Hills, Searingtown, Herricks, and the nine villages on the Great Neck peninsula.  She gave birth to twin daughters weeks before the election. 

Pilip campaigned on reviving Great Neck’s downtown, and acting as a bridge among the many minority communities in the district. She became the first-ever Republican from Great Neck to be elected a Nassau County Legislator. Her priorities have also included public safety, helping businesses that struggled during the Covid-19 pandemic, and fighting antisemitism. She is Chairwoman of the Nassau County Legislature Towns, Villages & Cities Committee, and Vice Chairwoman of its Health & Social Services Committee. She said: "Whether you are a Democrat or a Republican, even if you didn’t vote for me, I’m here for you. I put partisan politics aside ...."

As of January 2023, Pilip was being considered for a position that might become vacant in the United States Congress.  George Santos had been elected in 2022 to represent New York's 3rd congressional district in the 118th United States Congress. However, subsequently it was revealed that Santos had lied about his education, his career, his charitable work, being of Jewish descent, and having grandparents who survived the Holocaust. A number of politicians have called for his removal, and Nassau County Republican Party officials called for him to resign. In  January 2023, Pilip was under consideration for his position should it become vacant, and Politico reporter Olivia Beavers wrote that Pilip was one of two Republicans whom the Nassau County Republican Party was considering running if Santos were to resign.

References

External links
"Nassau County; District 10 - Mazi Melesa Pilip"
Instagram page

Living people
1970s births
21st-century African-American politicians
21st-century American politicians
21st-century American women politicians
21st-century Ethiopian women
21st-century Israeli military personnel
21st-century Israeli women
African-American politicians
American Orthodox Jews
American people of Ethiopian-Jewish descent
Black conservatism in the United States
Ethiopian emigrants to Israel
Ethiopian Jews
Israeli emigrants to the United States
Israeli female military personnel
Israeli people of Ethiopian-Jewish descent
New York (state) Republicans
Paratroopers
People from Great Neck, New York
Politicians from Nassau County, New York
Tel Aviv University alumni
University of Haifa alumni
Year of birth missing (living people)